Bruce Cummins (17 November 1929 – 22 August 2017) was an Australian rules footballer who played with St Kilda in the Victorian Football League (VFL). Bruce began with the Commonwealth Bank FC seniors, as a 19-year-old in the amateurs. In six seasons, mainly as a defender, Bruce wore the Blue and Gold in 57 matches, scoring two goals. Recruitment by VFL club St Kilda was short-lived for a 25-year-old. A year on, Bruce joined East St Kilda CYMS for the next 3 winters, before hanging up his boots relatively young at 28. A year on, his coaching career began with the Commonwealth Bank under 19s in their inaugural season. Seven years later, including one season as the club's second-only reserves coach after Jim Carroll lead as captain-coach in the inaugural winter, Bruce retired permanently from the game aged 35. Some credit must go to Bruce for the junior premiership just two years later. For services to the Commonwealth Bank club over 13 seasons, life membership was awarded in 1963.

Notes

External links 

2017 deaths
1929 births
Australian rules footballers from Victoria (Australia)
St Kilda Football Club players